The Herbert River Falls is a plunge waterfall on the Herbert River that is located in the UNESCO World Heritagelisted Wet Tropics in the Far North region of Queensland, Australia.

Location and features

See also

 List of waterfalls of Queensland

References

  

Waterfalls of Far North Queensland
Plunge waterfalls